Carnyorth (from , meaning "crag of the roe deer") is a hamlet in west Cornwall, England, United Kingdom. It is approximately one mile (1.6 km) south of Pendeen and six miles (10 km) northwest of Penzance. It is in the civil parish of St Just in Penwith
 
It lies along the B3306 road which connects St Ives to the A30 road near Land's End

Carnyorth lies within the Cornwall Area of Outstanding Natural Beauty (AONB) and the electoral division of St Just in Penwith. Almost a third of Cornwall has AONB designation, with the same status and protection as a National Park.

References

External links

Hamlets in Cornwall
St Just in Penwith